Zatonsky is a rural locality (a khutor) in Buyerak-Popovskoye Rural Settlement, Serafimovichsky District, Volgograd Oblast, Russia. The population was 180 as of 2010. There are 4 streets.

Geography 
Zatonsky is located south from Don River, 11 km southwest of Serafimovich (the district's administrative centre) by road. Serafimovich is the nearest rural locality.

References 

Rural localities in Serafimovichsky District